Mike Schultz (born August 27, 1981) is a Paralympic snowboarder and the founder of BioDapt Inc, a prosthetics business. He is a gold and two-time silver medalist in snowboarding at the Winter Paralympics.

Career
He was the flag-bearer for the United States at the 2018 Winter Paralympics Parade of Nations. He lost his leg in 2008 in a snowmobile race. He won gold and silver in Snowboarding at the 2018 Winter Paralympics. He later won the Best Male Athlete with a Disability ESPY Award.

He won the silver medal in the men's dual banked slalom SB-LL1 event at the 2021 World Para Snow Sports Championships held in Lillehammer, Norway. He also won the silver medal in the men's snowboard cross SB-LL1 event.

He won the silver medal in the men's snowboard cross SB-LL1 event at the 2022 Winter Paralympics held in Beijing, China.

References

External links 
 Mike Schultz at World Para Snowboard
 
 
 

1981 births
Living people
American male snowboarders
Paralympic snowboarders of the United States
Paralympic medalists in snowboarding
Paralympic gold medalists for the United States
Paralympic silver medalists for the United States
Snowboarders at the 2018 Winter Paralympics
Snowboarders at the 2022 Winter Paralympics
Medalists at the 2018 Winter Paralympics
Medalists at the 2022 Winter Paralympics
20th-century American people
21st-century American people